Rockmond Dunbar (born January 11, 1973) is an American actor, best known for his roles as Baines on the NBC series Earth 2, Kenny Chadway on Showtime family drama Soul Food, and Benjamin Miles "C-Note" Franklin on the Fox crime drama Prison Break. He also played Sheriff Eli Roosevelt on the FX Drama series Sons of Anarchy, FBI Agent Dennis Abbott on The Mentalist, FBI Agent Abe Gaines in the Hulu series The Path, and Michael Grant on 9-1-1.

Early life and education
Dunbar was born January 11, 1973,  in Oakland, California. He attended Oakland Technical High School and graduated from Morehouse College before moving on to study at the College of Santa Fe and the University of New Mexico.

Career

Television
Dunbar is known for his leading role as Kenny Chadway on the television series Soul Food, and TV Guide named him as one of "Television's 50 Sexiest Stars of All Time". He landed a regular role as Benjamin Miles "C-Note" Franklin on the television series Prison Break. In 2007, Dunbar starred on the short-lived TNT medical drama Heartland. He made a guest appearance on Noah's Arc as himself to give Noah (screenwriter and the main character of the show) some ideas about his movie Fine Art. He also had a recurring role on the UPN series Girlfriends, and is also known for his role as "Pookie" on the television series The Game. He was also a regular on the short-lived FX series Terriers.

Dunbar's other TV credits include guest appearances in Earth 2, Felicity, The Pretender, Two Guys and a Girl, and North Shore.

In 2011, he joined the cast of FX's show Sons of Anarchy as the new Sheriff of Charming, Eli Roosevelt. In 2013, Dunbar joined the CBS crime drama The Mentalist as FBI agent Dennis Abbott. In 2018, Dunbar joined the cast of 9-1-1 as Michael Grant, leaving in 2021 over the COVID-19 vaccine mandate, after his requests for exemptions were denied. In February 2022, it was reported that he has sued the makers of the show, saying he "was denied medical and religious exemptions and faced racial discrimination." In July 25, 2022, it was reported that Dunbar's case of racial misconduct was dismissed as baseless by a judge in a Los Angeles Courtroom, but that Disney/Fox does face some claims from Rockmond Dunbar alleging religious and racial discrimination, retaliation and breach of contract, among other claims.

Film
His film projects include Punks (which debuted at the 2000 Sundance Film Festival), Misery Loves Company, Sick Puppies, Whodunit, Dirty Laundry, All About You, Kiss Kiss Bang Bang, and the Tyler Perry-produced film, The Family That Preys.

Other
Dunbar has contributed to the art world through the mixed media exhibit, ARTHERAPY.  He posed for the November 2003 issue of Playgirl magazine.

Personal life 
According to DNA analysis, Dunbar's ancestry is mainly from the Yoruba people of Nigeria. On his visit to Nigeria, he was given the Yoruba name, Omobowale (a variant form of Omowale) meaning "our son has come home".

Dunbar was married to Ivy Holmes from 2003 to 2006.  Years later, he became engaged to his girlfriend Maya Gilbert, an actress and writer.  After dating for a year, the couple's engagement took place in Montego Bay, Jamaica on December 30, 2012.

Dunbar is a member of the Church of Universal Wisdom, whose members are "obligated to avoid medical intervention that introduces disease into the body". His lawsuit against Disney and Fox alleges that their lawyers called his religion "fake" and his beliefs "insincere" in discussions about the Covid-19 vaccination mandate.

Filmography

Film

Television

References

External links

1973 births
Living people
African-American male actors
American male film actors
American male television actors
Male actors from Berkeley, California
American people of Yoruba descent
American people of Nigerian descent
Yoruba male actors
20th-century American male actors
21st-century American male actors
Morehouse College alumni
University of New Mexico alumni
20th-century African-American people
21st-century African-American people